Dillandia is a genus of flowering plants in the family Asteraceae.

 Species
 Dillandia chachapoyensis (H.Rob.) V.A.Funk & H.Rob. - Peru
 Dillandia subumbellata V.A.Funk & H.Rob. - Peru, Ecuador

References

Liabeae
Asteraceae genera